Soyea Island or Soyea is an uninhabited rocky island at the mouth of Loch Inver, in Assynt, Sutherland, in the council area of Highland, Scotland. Soyea marks the entrance of the fishing harbour of Lochinver. Soyea Island has a yellow pedestal light on it.

History 
The name "Soyea" is Old Norse and means "Sheep-isle" or "Sea island". In 1881 it was recorded as a pastoral islet. In the 1920s, Soyea had a colony of Abraxas grossulariata (magpie moths) which were rare on the mainland.

References

External links 

 
 

Islands of Sutherland
Uninhabited islands of Highland (council area)